Shady Lady Bed and Breakfast (formerly known as Shady Lady Ranch until 2014) is a bed and breakfast in Farmer Station, Nevada, United States on U.S. Highway 95 about  north of Beatty. It operated as a legal brothel until 2014.

History
The ranch operated as a brothel until 2014 when it converted to a guest ranch-oriented bed and breakfast. As a brothel, it was known for challenging Nevada laws that prohibited the advertising of prostitution services, and that effectively banned male prostitution by requiring all such workers to receive regular cervical exams.

Legal cases

Brothel advertising
In 2006, the owner Bobbi Davis, along with two newspapers and with help from the ACLU, challenged a 1979 state law which prohibited the advertising of brothels in counties where prostitution was illegal. This effort was opposed by other brothel owners who were wary that overly explicit brothel advertisements could result in outlawing of the industry.

A federal judge overturned the law in 2007 as "overly broad", but that decision was reversed by a 3-judge panel of the U.S. Ninth Circuit Court of Appeals in March 2010. The ACLU appealed, but the Supreme Court of the United States refused to hear the appeal, leaving the ban in force.

Male prostitution
In 2009, Davis decided to hire a male prostitute, a first in Nevada. The move was supported by the ACLU and opposed by the Nevada Brothel Owners Association (of which the Shady Lady Ranch is not a member), fearing that it could invite unwanted scrutiny and hurt the industry. A Nevada law defines legal prostitutes to be women and requires them to submit to weekly cervical exams, but did not have any provisions for male prostitutes, a technicality that kept men from working as prostitutes. Davis successfully challenged this provision before the Nevada State Health Division and the Nye County Licensing and Liquor Board. The law was changed to allow for men to legally work as prostitutes as long as they submit  weekly urethral specimens, work exclusively with condoms, and submit to monthly blood tests.

In January 2010 the brothel hired a male prostitute by the name of "Markus" and charged $200 for 40 minutes, $300 for an hour and $500 for two hours. Markus quit several weeks later after drawing fewer than ten customers. The brothel later hired a replacement.

See also
 Prostitution in Nevada
 List of brothels in Nevada

References

Brothels in Nevada